is an artificial island. It is part of Konohana-ku (此花区), one of the 24 wards of Osaka, Japan. It is near the mouth of the Yodo River. When all the landfill is completed the total area will be . 

It will be the site of Expo 2025, a World's Fair to be held in 2025.

Overview 
It is located southwest of the island of Maishima, in the westernmost end of Osaka City. It is one of the 3 artificial island areas targeted by the “Technoport Osaka” plan formulated in 1988 with the aim of developing a new city center.

There are two high-standard container terminals with a depth of 15 meters in the south of Yumeshima, but most of the area is unoccupied. The southern end of Yumeshima is positioned as a logistics center.

In April 2014, Governor Ichirō Matsui of Osaka Prefecture announced that it would promote Yumeshima as a candidate site for an integrated resort (IR) with a casino. Additionally, Osaka made its official bid for the 2025 World Expo on April 24, 2017. Yumeshima was a possible location. with the theme “Designing Future Society for Our Lives”. On November 23, 2018, Osaka won the ballot vote. The World Expo will take place for six months in 2025.

History
Acquisition of landfill license in 1977. Start of development of waste disposal site.
Started land creation project in 1991. 
2002 Yumemai Bridge opened.
Inauguration of the Yumeshima Container Terminal in 2002. 
2009 Yume Saki tunnel (road section) opened.

Transportation
Yumeshima and Maishima are connected via the Yumemai Bridge. Yumeshima and Sakishima are connected with the Yume Saki tunnel. No pedestrians or bicycles are allowed in the tunnel. There is public transportation with a sightseeing bus that stops at Cosmosquare Station. There are plans to extend the Osaka Metro Chūō Line, Sakurajima Line and Keihan Nakanoshima Line to the upcoming integrated resort. The commute will be about 30 minutes from Ōsaka Station to a new station on Yumeshima.

References

Artificial islands of Japan
Konohana-ku, Osaka
Geography of Osaka
World's fair sites in Osaka